Admiral Sir Sackville Hamilton Carden  (3 May 1857 – 6 May 1930) was a senior Royal Navy officer of the late nineteenth and early twentieth centuries. In cooperation with the French Navy, he commanded British naval forces in the Mediterranean Sea during the First World War.

Early life
Carden was born in Barnane near Templemore in County Tipperary, Ireland, the third son of Andrew Carden and Anne Berkeley. Although both his father and grandfather had served in the British Army, he elected for a naval career and joined the Royal Navy in 1870.

Military career
Carden's early career was marked by service in Egypt and the Sudan and later, under Harry Rawson, in the Benin Expedition of 1897. He was on 16 October 1902 appointed in command of the battleship HMS Magnificent, serving as flagship to rear-admiral Assheton Curzon-Howe, second in command of the Channel Squadron, and took her to visit Gibraltar and Tetuan the following week. In 1908, he was promoted rear admiral. After two years on half-pay, he was assigned to the Atlantic Fleet, and raised his flag aboard  for one year. Following his return to London, he was posted to the Admiralty until August 1912, at which point he was appointed Admiral Superintendent of Malta Dockyard.

In September 1914, he was appointed Commander of the Eastern Mediterranean Squadron operating in the Mediterranean, under the leadership of a French admiral. Following the Ottoman Empire's entry into the war on the side of the Central Powers in November 1914, Carden was asked by the British Admiralty to develop a strategy to force open the Dardanelles (Canakkale Bogazi) in January of the following year. Carden's plan called for the systematic destruction of Turkish fortifications along the Dardanelles while advancing slowly up the strait, in addition to extensive minesweeping operations. Initially commander-in-chief of British naval forces during the Dardanelles campaign, Carden was successful in early offensives against Turkish defences from 19 February until early March, when he was relieved of command owing to his failing health and strain of anxiety which proved too much for him causing a nervous breakdown and was replaced by Admiral John de Robeck.

Resigning from the Royal Navy two years later with the rank of admiral, Carden lived in retirement until his death in 1930.

Notes

References
 
Callwell, C. E., The Dardanelles. Boston, 1919.
Corbett, Sir Julian S., Naval Operations. London, 1924.
Bunbury, Turtle, The Glorious Madness, Tales of The Irish and The Great War, Sackville Carden and the Naval Attack on the Dardanelles, pp. 144–55, Gill & Macmillan, Dublin 12 (2014)

External links
The Dreadnought Project – Sackville Carden
The personal papers of Admiral Sir Sackville Hamilton Carden held at Churchill Archives Centre, Cambridge

1857 births
1930 deaths
People from County Tipperary
Knights Commander of the Order of St Michael and St George
Royal Navy admirals
Royal Navy admirals of World War I
Royal Navy personnel of the Anglo-Egyptian War
Royal Navy personnel of the Mahdist War
British military personnel of the Benin Expedition of 1897